Bosistoa medicinalis, commonly known as the northern towra or Eumundi bosistoa, is a species of small to medium-sized rainforest tree that is endemic to Queensland. It has simple and pinnate leaves with two or three leaflets and panicles of small white flowers.

Description
The leaflets have prominent oil glands and a pointed tip. Each twig ends with two simple leaves and a terminal bud.

Taxonomy
Northern towra was first formally described in 1866 by Ferdinand von Mueller who gave it the name Pagetia medicinalis and published the description in Fragmenta phytographiae Australiae. In 1977, Thomas Gordon Hartley changed the name to Bosistoa medicinalis in the Journal of the Arnold Arboretum.

Distribution and habitat
Bosistoa medicinalis grows in rainforest, often dry rainforest in near-coastal areas between the Pascoe River in northern Queensland to Woombye in south-eastern Queensland.

Conservation status
This species is listed as of "least concern" under the Queensland Government Nature Conservation Act 1992.

References

medicinalis
Sapindales of Australia
Flora of Queensland
Plants described in 1866
Taxa named by Ferdinand von Mueller